Top Gear may refer to:

 "Top gear", the highest gear available in a vehicle's manual transmission

Television
 Top Gear (1977 TV series), a British motoring magazine programme
 Top Gear (2002 TV series), a relaunched version of the original show 
 Top Gear (2011 TV series), a Chinese adaptation
 Top Gear (2014 TV series), another Chinese adaptation
 Top Gear (American TV series), 2010–2016
 Top Gear America, from 2017
 Top Gear Australia, 2008–2012
 Top Gear France, from 2015
 Top Gear Italia, 2016
 Top Gear Korea, from 2011
 Top Gear Russia, 2009

Other uses
Top Gear (magazine), a British magazine based on the TV show
Top Gear (Indian magazine)
Top Gear (radio programme), BBC radio music programme 1964–1975
Top Gear (retailer), clothes boutique of the 1960s in London
Top Gear (video game series)
Top Gear (video game), for the Super Nintendo Entertainment System

See also
 Propulsion transmission